The Trans-Pacific Strategic Economic Partnership Agreement (TPSEP), also known as P4, is a trade agreement between four Pacific Rim countries concerning a variety of matters of economic policy. The agreement was signed by Brunei, Chile, Singapore and New Zealand in 2005 and entered into force in 2006. It is a comprehensive trade agreement, affecting trade in goods, rules of origin, trade remedies, sanitary and phytosanitary measures, technical barriers to trade, trade in services, intellectual property, government procurement and competition policy. Among other things, it called for reduction by 90 percent of all tariffs between member countries by 1 January 2006, and reduction of all trade tariffs to zero by the year 2015.

Earlier agreements
By 2001, New Zealand and Singapore had concluded the Agreement between New Zealand and Singapore on a Closer Economic Partnership (NZSCEP). The Trans-Pacific Strategic Economic Partnership Agreement built on the NZSCEP.

Negotiations
During the 2002 Asia-Pacific Economic Cooperation (APEC) Leaders' Meeting in Los Cabos, Mexico, Prime Ministers Helen Clark of New Zealand, Goh Chok Tong of Singapore and Chilean President Ricardo Lagos began negotiations on the Pacific Three Closer Economic Partnership (P3-CEP). According to the New Zealand Department of Foreign Affairs and Trade,

Brunei first took part as a full negotiating party in April 2005 before the fifth, and final round of talks. Subsequently, the agreement was renamed to TPSEP (Trans-Pacific Strategic Economic Partnership agreement or Pacific-4). Negotiations on the Trans-Pacific Strategic Economic Partnership Agreement (TPSEP or P4) were concluded by Brunei, Chile, New Zealand and Singapore on 3 June 2005, and entered into force on 28 May 2006 for New Zealand and Singapore, 12 July 2006 for Brunei, and 8 November 2006 for Chile.

Parties

Although the TPSEP agreement contains an accession clause and affirms the members' "commitment to encourage the accession to this Agreement by other economies", no such accession have taken place. All four countries were involved however in the negotiations for the Trans-Pacific Partnership Agreement, about which agreement was reached in 2015 involving eight additional parties. 

The TPSEP (and the TPP it grew into) are not APEC initiatives. However, the TPP is considered to be a pathfinder for the proposed Free Trade Area of the Asia Pacific (FTAAP), an APEC initiative.

See also
 Trans-Pacific Partnership
 Pacific Alliance
 Rules of Origin
 Market access
 Free-trade area
 Tariffs

References

External links

Trade blocs
Free trade agreements
Treaties of Brunei
Free trade agreements of New Zealand
Free trade agreements of Chile
Trans-Pacific Partnership
Free trade agreements of Singapore
Treaties concluded in 2005
Treaties entered into force in 2006